The Caldwell House, just east of Shelbyville, Kentucky, was built in 1892.  It was listed on the National Register of Historic Places in 1988.

It is a two-story hip-roofed frame house with decorative features derived from Queen Anne pattern books.  The listing included a second contributing building, an original frame barn.

It is located on U.S. Route 60 at Kentucky Route 53.

References

National Register of Historic Places in Shelby County, Kentucky
Queen Anne architecture in Kentucky
Houses completed in 1892
Houses in Shelby County, Kentucky
1892 establishments in Kentucky